Theofan of Poltava (born Vassili Dimitrievich Bystrov, ; 12 January 1875 - 6 February 1940) was a Russian archbishop and theologian in the Eastern Orthodox Church. He was widely known as the "only Russian ascetic bishop". Theofan was the occasional confessor of Tsar Nicholas II of Russia and his wife Alexandra.

Early years 
Basil was born in Luzhsky Uyezd (now Shimsky District) as the son of a priest and baptized on the day of St. Basil the Great. In 1896 he finished his studies at St Petersburg Theological Academy, which he had entered as one of the youngest students. The year after he became assistant-professor in history of the Old Testament. In 1898 he became a monk under the name of Theophanes the Confessor; in 1901 archimandrite.

In the summer of 1902, a student at the Ecclesiastical Academy named Leonid Feodorov approached Archimandrite Theofan seeking permission to interrupt his studies for the priesthood and be granted a passport for a foreign trip to Rome. Feodorov was already known to be discreetly attending the Tridentine Mass at St. Catherine's Church on Nevsky Prospect and his teachers had already taken to calling Feodorov, "our Catholic."

Despite knowing that Feodorov intended to openly convert from the Russian Orthodox Church to Roman Catholicism, Archimandrite Theofan chose, instead of reporting Feodorov to the Okhrana, to tell him, "I know very well why you wish to go to Italy... So be it, and may God keep you." Fr. Cyril Korolevsky alleges that Archimandrite Theofan, "was quite convinced of the truth of Catholicism, but like a number of others he could not bring himself to take the definite step." In reality, Archimandrite Theofan remained Orthodox even after the October Revolution, when he lived as a refugee in Bulgaria and France.

In 1905, Archimandrite Theofan received his master's degree on the Tetragrammaton. He was friendly with Grigory Rasputin, "who amazed us all with his psychological perspicacity", and invited him to his apartment. Theofan introduced Rasputin to the Grand Duchess Milica of Montenegro, who in her turn introduced him to the Imperial couple on 1 November 1905 (O.S.).
Two weeks later Theofan was invited and became their spiritual guide. In 1908 Theofan (and brother Makary) visited Rasputin in his home village Pokrovskoye and investigated his supposed Khlyst behavior, after charges made the year before.

In 1901 Theofan had already become inspector, in 1909 he was appointed rector of the St Petersburg Theological Academy. Theofan was a devout monarchist and came to the conclusion Rasputin was a garrulous person, a false starets and could be a danger to the throne. Theofan and Rasputin became enemies. In 1910 Theofan moved to the Crimea, because of his health. He was appointed bishop of the eparchy of Simferopol and at the same time elected as an honorary member of the St Petersburg Theological Academy. In 1911 Hermogenes, Iliodor and Theofan were banned due to a conflict with Rasputin and Alexandra Fyodorovna.

In 1912 Theofan was appointed as bishop in Astrakhan, but his health got worse; in March 1913 he was created bishop in Poltava. From 1917–1918 he lived in Moscow and testified about Rasputin and the Tsarina. He became involved in local politics. In 1919 he was evacuated by the White army to Sevastopol. In 1920 he emigrated to Constantinople. From there he moved to Petkovica monastery in Serbia, and to Sofia and Varna in Bulgaria. From 1931 he lived in Clamart and in Mosnes (in France), leading the life of a hermit.

References

1875 births
1940 deaths
People from Novgorod Oblast
People from Luzhsky Uyezd
Bishops of the Russian Orthodox Church
Russian monarchists